The following is a list of people from Cloud County, Kansas.  Inclusion on the list should be reserved for notable people past and present who have lived in the county, either in cities or rural areas.

Academics
 May Louise Cowles, early advocate of teaching home economics
 George Norlin, former president of the University of Colorado

Arts
 Jim Garver, country music guitarist
 Robert E. Pearson, filmmaker
 Helen Talbot, film actress and pin-up girl
 Patrice Wymore, film and stage actress

Athletes
  Tom Brosius, track and field athlete
  Keith Christensen, professional football player
  George Dockins, major league baseball player
  Bill Dotson, track and field athlete
  Mike Gardner, college football coach
  Larry Hartshorn, professional football player
  Mike Kirkland, women's track & field coach
  Tim McCarty, college football coach
  Ernest C. Quigley, college football coach and major league baseball umpire
  Harry Short, baseball player
  Shanele Stires, professional basketball player
  Elmer Stricklett, major league baseball player
  Kaye Vaughan, professional football player

Clergy
 Orval Butcher, founding pastor of Skyline Church
 Most Reverend Charles Joseph Chaput, OFM Cap, archbishop of the Roman Catholic Archdiocese of Philadelphia, Pennsylvania
 Right Rev. John Francis Cunningham, Bishop of Concordia
 Jim Garlow, pastor of Skyline Church
 Constantine Scollen, missionary priest, resident 1896-1898

Journalists
  Henry Buckingham, newspaper publisher
  Avis Tucker, publisher

Politicians
 Charles H. Blosser, namesake of Blosser Municipal Airport
 Elaine Bowers, member of the Kansas Legislature
 Napoleon Bonaparte Brown, politician and businessman
 Frank Carlson, United States Senator, Representative, and Governor of Kansas
 James Manney Hagaman, founder of Concordia, Kansas
 Deanell Reece Tacha, retired United States federal judge
 W. O. Woods, former Treasurer of the United States

Others
  Boston Corbett, known as the man who shot John Wilkes Booth
  Pop Hollinger, one of the first to begin collecting comic books for resale

See also

 Lists of people from Kansas

References

Cloud County